Henry Reeve (April 4, 1850 – August 4, 1876) was a brigadier general in Cuba's  (Army of Liberation) – more commonly known as the  – during the Ten Years' War (1868–1878). In his youth, he was a drummer boy in the Union Army during the American Civil War.

Biography 
He was born in Brooklyn, New York, United States, on April 4, 1850, son of Alexander Reeve and Maddie Carroll, and died in Matanzas, Cuba on August 4, 1876. Reeve was 26 years old at the time of his death, and had served in the Cuban Army for seven years, having participated in over 400 engagements against the Spanish Army.

Legacy 
Reeve was honored by the Cuban government in 1976 on the centenary of his death with a postal stamp.

In response to Hurricane Katrina, Cuba proposed sending a group of 1,586 doctors to assist humanitarian efforts in the United States. The offer was declined, and in September 2005 Cuban president Fidel Castro renamed the group the Henry Reeve Brigade in honor of Reeve.

References

External links 
 Speech by Fidel Castro initiating the Henry Reeve's Contingent

1850 births
1876 deaths
Cuban soldiers
People of the Ten Years' War
American emigrants to Cuba
Military personnel from New York City
People from Brooklyn